This is a list of notable Hindu comparative theologians, Hindu scholars or preachers engaged in Hindu comparative religion studies.
Adi Shankaracharya
Ram Mohan Roy
Vivekananda
Dayanand Saraswati
Ram Swarup
Sita Ram Goel
Arun Shourie
Sarvepalli Radhakrishnan
Girish Chandra Sen
Pandit Lekh Ram

See also 
List of writers on Hinduism

References 

Hinduism-related lists